Köselerli is a village in Tarsus district of Mersin Province, Turkey. The population of village is 200 as of 2012. Cotton, fruits and especially grapes are the pronounced crops of the village . A big tourism complex on the Mediterranean Sea shore is under construction.(see Tourism centers of Mersin Province)  When finished, it may be another source of revenue for the village.

References 

Villages in Tarsus District